Lee Markholt . (born May 24, 1963 in Tacoma, Washington) is a professional poker player from  Tacoma Washington. A former bull rider, he has been playing poker professionally for more than 29 years.

Markholt's first major win came on the Professional Poker Tour when he won the Five Star World Poker Classic in 2005. He has had success in both the World Series of Poker and the World Poker Tour in his career. He has 40 career WSOP cashes, including 5 final tables. He has cashed 28 times in the WPT, including six cashes each in Season 5 and Season 6. He reached his first WPT final table at the World Poker Challenge in 2008, claiming his first WPT title and the $493,815 first prize.

As of 2017, his total live tournament winnings exceed $4,000,000

References

1963 births
American poker players
World Poker Tour winners
People from Eatonville, Washington
Sportspeople from Tacoma, Washington
Living people